A list of the governors of Siena, a jurisdiction of the Grand Duchy of Tuscany (1569−1859) after the dissolution of the Republic of Siena.

The republic was centered on the present day city of Siena, located in the Tuscany region of Italy.

Governors of Siena

Alfonso Piccolomini (1528-1530), (1531-1541), native of Siena.
Caterina de' Medici (1627–1629) daughter of Ferdinando I de' Medici, Grand Duke of Tuscany.
Leopoldo de' Medici (1636–1641), (1643-1644) son of Cosimo II de' Medici, Grand Duke of Tuscany. 
Mattias de' Medici (1629-1636), (1641-1643), son of Cosimo II de' Medici, Grand Duke of Tuscany. 
Francesco Maria de' Medici (1683-1711) son of Ferdinando II de' Medici, Grand Duke of Tuscany.
Unknown (1711-1717)
Violante Beatrice of Bavaria (1717-1731) daughter in law of Cosimo III de' Medici, Grand Duke of Tuscany.

 
Governors of Siena
Siena
Governors of Siena